To Swing or Not to Swing (subtitled Barney Kessel Volume 3) is an album by guitarist Barney Kessel released on the Contemporary label which was recorded at sessions in 1955.

Reception

The AllMusic review by Scott Yanow states: "the overall result is a recording highly recommended to fans of straight-ahead jazz".

Track listing
All compositions by Barney Kessel, except as indicated
 "Begin the Blues" - 4:29
 "Louisiana" (J. C. Johnson, Andy Razaf, Bob Schafer) - 3:57
 "Happy Feeling" - 3:58
 "Embraceable You" (George Gershwin, Ira Gershwin) - 3:24
 "Wail Street" - 4:25
 "Back Home Again in Indiana" (James F. Hanley, Ballard MacDonald) - 3:13
 "Moten Swing" (Bennie Moten, Buster Moten) - 3:58
 "Midnight Sun" (Sonny Burke, Lionel Hampton) - 3:10
 "Contemporary Blues" - 4:09
 "Don't Blame Me" (Jimmy McHugh, Dorothy Fields) - 2:58
 "Twelfth Street Rag" (Euday L. Bowman) - 2:55 	  
Recorded at Contemporary's studio in Los Angeles on March 28, 1955 (tracks 3, 5 & 9) and July 26, 1955 (tracks 1, 2, 4, 6-8, 10 & 11).

Personnel
Barney Kessel - guitar
Harry Edison - trumpet (tracks 2, 3 & 6-10)
Georgie Auld (tracks 2, 6, 7 & 12), Bill Perkins (tracks 3, 5 & 9) - tenor saxophone
Jimmy Rowles - piano
Al Hendrickson - guitar 
Red Mitchell - bass
Irv Cottler (tracks 1, 2, 4, 6-8, 10 & 11), Shelly Manne (tracks 3, 5 & 9) - drums

References

Contemporary Records albums
Barney Kessel albums
1956 albums